Adrien Lavieille (March 29, 1848, Montmartre – February 5, 1920, Chartres) was a French painter.

Son of the landscape painter Eugène Lavieille, and nephew of the wood-engraver Jacques Adrien Lavieille (1818–1862), he was a painter of the country : near Paris, in Brittany, near Cancale and on the riverside of the Vilaine in the south of Rennes, in Touraine, at Saint-Jean-de-Monts in Vendée, where he was invited by a friend, the painter and engraver Auguste Lepère, around Vendôme where he sojourned in the home of his daughter, Andrée Lavieille, so a painter, and of his son-in-law, the man of letters, Paul Tuffrau.

He also painted in Montmartre, where he lived during his youthful days, and, as his father, at Moret-sur-Loing, near Fontainebleau.

Parallelly to his painter's activities, Adrien Lavieille executed, during his life, for money's reasons, works of restoration and decoration : basilica Saint-Martin in Tours (where he worked with the painter Pierre Fritel), Palais de Justice of Rennes, Château de Vaux-le-Vicomte, Hôtel de Lauzun, quai d'Anjou in Paris.

In 1878, he married the painter Marie Petit, who henceforth signed Marie Adrien Lavieille.

Bibliography
 Françoise Cambon, Henri Cambon. Adrien Lavieille (1848–1920), peintre de la campagne. Atlantica, 2008.

External links
 Presentation of Adrien Lavieille and of his works

19th-century French painters
French male painters
20th-century French painters
20th-century French male artists
French landscape painters
1848 births
1920 deaths
19th-century French male artists